Scopula minuta is a moth of the  family Geometridae. It is found on Madagascar.

References

Moths described in 1900
minuta
Moths of Madagascar
Moths of Africa